McCartney II is the second solo album by English musician Paul McCartney, released on 16 May 1980. It was recorded by McCartney at his home studio in the summer of 1979, shortly before the dissolution of his band Wings in 1981. Like his first solo album, McCartney (1970), he performed all the instruments himself. It yielded three singles: "Coming Up", "Waterfalls", and "Temporary Secretary".

The album was a significant departure for McCartney, as much of it relies heavily on synthesizers and studio experimentation, while its music style embraces new wave and elements of electronica. It was initially released to largely unfavourable reviews by critics, though retrospective reception has been more positive and the album has become a cult favourite. In 2011, an expanded edition of McCartney II was issued with over a dozen bonus tracks. In 2020, the album was succeeded by McCartney III. In 2022, the trilogy was reissued in the McCartney I II III box set.

Background

After the release of what turned out to be Wings' final album, Back to the Egg, McCartney went north to his farm in Scotland to begin some private recordings in July 1979. "Check My Machine" samples dialogue from the 1957 Merrie Melodies cartoon featuring Tweety and Sylvester entitled Tweet Zoo. By sessions' end, he had recorded over 20 songs. With no immediate use for the recordings, he put them aside for the time being and returned to work with Wings to prepare for a UK tour that November and December. Simultaneously with the performances (which included the new "Coming Up"), McCartney released his first solo single since 1971, the Christmas-themed "Wonderful Christmastime", backed with "Rudolph the Red-Nosed Reggae", which charted at No. 6 in the UK but initially only at No. 83 in the US. (The song later reached No. 28 in 2020.) The A-side was recorded during the McCartney II sessions, while its flip side had been cut in 1975. However, upcoming events were about to change McCartney's plans with Wings.

After years of visa refusals due to his past arrests for marijuana possession, Japan had finally allowed McCartney, and thus Wings, to perform. It would be the first instance McCartney had performed in the country since he had done so with the Beatles in 1966, and anticipation was running high with Wings' tour completely sold out. However, upon his arrival in Tokyo on 16 January 1980, a search of McCartney's luggage revealed a bag containing 219 grams of marijuana, prompting his immediate arrest and eventually cancelling the tour. After a nine-day jail stay, McCartney was released and returned home to his Scottish farm. Deciding to put Wings on hold while he contemplated his future, he now decided to issue his solo recordings from the previous summer.

Music and lyrics
McCartney II was named in follow-up to his debut album McCartney (1970) because McCartney plays all instruments on both albums; he has also since stated that he had specifically hired a 16-track machine and "a couple of microphones" with which to record this album, adding that he had himself alternately played the drums used in several recording in either the kitchen or bathroom in order to achieve the echo he sought on particular songs.

Featuring arrangements that are heavy on synthesisers, McCartney II has been said to represent McCartney's "acceptance of new wave," and has been described as "airless proto-electronica." The album is often experimental, with most of its songs having been described as strange "eccentric synthpop". Although McCartney denies any direct influences on the album, he admired the "eccentricity" and "not-mainstream attitude" of Talking Heads' David Byrne.
McCartney was also inspired by experimental composers John Cage, Cornelius Cardew and Luciano Berio; McCartney explained: "I went to their concerts in London because I had plenty of time on my hands so it was the kind of thing I would go and see. Again, just to see what it was about, not necessarily because I was a massive fan. It was more like: what is a prepared piano? Oh, that's what it is. You know, funky stuff like that."

According to Stephen Dalton of The Quietus, parts of the album are reminiscent of krautrock and "the whole post-punk disco boom", and described most of the album as "an alluringly weird mash-up of trip-hop, Krautrock and synth-pop." McCartney said that, "rather than me emulating anyone, it was more a question of me seeing what I could do with it. And again, not necessarily thinking I was making an album, just to have some time to experiment. These days I would say that with The Fireman project. So I've always been into that – if you go from 'Tomorrow Never Knows' through McCartney I, McCartney II, The Fireman…" Many of the most synthesised tracks are instrumentals which have been described as ambient; journalist Stephen Thomas Erlewine compared them "to a sprightly variation" of the instrumentals from the second side of Low (1977) by David Bowie, albeit with a warmer, less menacing sound.

Lead single "Coming Up" – an uplifting dance number – appeared that April with a video (Paul playing all the bandmates, dubbed 'The Plastic Macs', except for the backing singers played by Linda) and with two B-sides by Wings:  "Coming Up (Live at Glasgow)", recorded during Wings' December 1979 show there, and the piano laden instrumental "Lunch Box/Odd Sox" (a Venus and Mars outtake). An immediate UK No. 2 hit, "Coming Up" was flipped over for the live Wings version in the US where it became another No. 1 for McCartney, greatly raising hopes for his first solo album proper in years. The live Wings version of "Coming Up" was also included as a one-sided 7-inch single in copies of McCartney II within the US and Canada.

"Temporary Secretary" features frantic synthesiser lines and lyrics about requiring a secretary of any skill level for a short period of time. McCartney dubbed the song an "experiment," saying that he found the concept of a temporary secretary humorous. "Temporary Secretary" was released as a 12" single in Britain, backed with the experimental non-album track "Secret Friend". Author Howard Sounes thought it a "sexy" track. The single was only released in a quantity of 25,000 copies, failing to make an impact on the charts. The single artwork was created by Jeff Cummins of Hipgnosis. The song was performed live for the first time at the London O2 Arena on 23 May 2015. It was sampled in the 3D RDN remix of "Deep Deep Feeling" on McCartney III Imagined.

Release and reception

McCartney II was released in mid-May. The album debuted in UK at number one on the UK Albums Chart, becoming McCartney's first number-one there since Venus and Mars in 1975. EMI reported that the album was on track to equal the sales of Band on the Run. The second single from the album, "Waterfalls", peaked at number nine in the singles chart.

In the US, initial sales were strong thanks to the hit single "Coming Up" and the album reached number three in its second week on the Billboard album chart where it remained for five weeks. "Waterfalls" went virtually unnoticed in the US, only "bubbling under" the Billboard Hot 100 at number 106 for one week. The album quickly dropped down the charts and was off the Billboard chart after 19 weeks, McCartney's shortest run since Wild Life. It was one of his lowest-selling albums in the US up to that point.

The critical reception to McCartney II was mostly negative. Many critics found the album slight, with its experimental, synth-based compositions and its handful of instrumentals. Record World magazine described it as "arguably the least well-received solo work of any Beatle".

Retrospective reviews and legacy

Retrospective reviews have rated the album more highly. Some writers credit it as a forerunner to the sound of 1980s pop.

In 2003, Mojo placed the album at number 26 on their list of the "Top 50 Eccentric Albums". In 2011, NME included the album on their list of "101 Albums to Hear Before You Die," whose list entries were selected by different musicians; McCartney II was picked by Austin Williams of Swim Deep.

In 2018, Pitchfork ranked it at number 186 in their list of "The 200 Best Albums of the 1980s". They called it a "strange, guileless wisp of a synth-pop record" and wrote that although "[o]riginally derided as a novelty, McCartney II is now remarkable in its prescience of the lo-fi and bedroom pop movements."

Reissues
The initial issue of McCartney on compact disc featured "Check My Machine" and "Secret Friend" as bonus tracks. The two songs were originally released as the B-sides of "Waterfalls" and "Temporary Secretary", respectively. In 1993, McCartney II was remastered and reissued on CD as part of "The Paul McCartney Collection" series with Wings' 1979 hit "Goodnight Tonight" added as a third bonus track.

When the new remastered version was released on 13 June 2011 as part of the Paul McCartney Archive Collection, the album re-entered the UK charts at number 108.

The album was reissued on 5 August 2022 in a boxset entitled McCartney I II III, consisting of 3 LPs or 3 CDs, along with the first and third albums of the trilogy.

Influence
McCartney II was described as an influence on Hot Chip's album Made in the Dark (2008), especially with songs like "Wrestlers", "Bendable Poseable", "Whistle for Will" and "We're Looking for a Lot of Love". "Now There Is Nothing" from the band's later album In Our Heads (2012) has been described as a homage to McCartney II, with their guitarist Al Doyle explaining the song has "quite deliberately quirky time signature changes and key changes and these sort of very wandering harmonies—very typical of that period and McCartney productions." Alexis Taylor of the group has described McCartney II as one of his favourite albums of all time. The album has also been championed by multiple other musicians such as disc jockey Erol Alkan, Chris Carter of Throbbing Gristle, Gruff Rhys of Super Furry Animals and Ty Bulmer of New Young Pony Club.

Track listing
All songs written by Paul McCartney.

Side one
 "Coming Up" – 3:53
 "Temporary Secretary" – 3:14
 "On the Way" – 3:38
 "Waterfalls" – 4:43
 "Nobody Knows" – 2:52

Side two
 "Front Parlour" – 3:32
 "Summer's Day Song" – 3:25
 "Frozen Jap" – 3:40
 "Bogey Music" – 3:27
 "Darkroom" – 2:20
 "One of These Days" – 3:35

Archive Collection Reissue

In 2011 the album was re-issued by Hear Music/Concord Music Group as part of the second set of releases, alongside McCartney, in the Paul McCartney Archive Collection. It was released in various formats:

Standard Edition 1-CD; the original 11-track album
Special Edition 2-CD; the original 11-track album on the first disc, plus 8 bonus tracks on a second disc
Deluxe Edition 3-CD/1-DVD; the original 11-track album, the bonus tracks disc, a limited and numbered 128-page book containing many previously unpublished images by Linda McCartney. The book features album and single artwork and a full history of the making of the album, complete with a new interview with Paul and expanded track by track information. The DVD features rare and previously unseen footage (including rehearsal footage of "Coming Up" and a new video for the unreleased track "Blue Sway")
Remastered vinyl 2-LP version containing the Special Edition and a download link to the material
High Resolution 24bit 96 kHz limited and unlimited audio versions of all 27 songs on the remastered album and bonus audio discs

Disc 1 – The original 11-track album

Disc 2 – Bonus Audio 1
"Blue Sway" (with Richard Niles Orchestration) – 4:35
"Coming Up" (Live at the Apollo Theatre, Glasgow – 17 December 1979) – 4:08
"Check My Machine" (Regular Single B-side Edited Version) – 5:50
"Bogey Wobble" – 2:59
"Secret Friend" (Full Length Version) – 10:31
"Mr H Atom" / "You Know I'll Get You Baby" – 5:55
"Wonderful Christmastime" (Regular A-side Version) – 3:47
"All You Horse Riders" / "Blue Sway" – 10:15

Disc 3 – Bonus Audio 2
"Coming Up" (Full Length Version) – 5:34
"Front Parlour" (Full Length Version) – 5:15
"Frozen Jap" (Full Length Version) – 5:43
"Darkroom" (Full Length Version) – 3:45
"Check My Machine" (Full Length Version) – 8:58
"Wonderful Christmastime" (Full Length Version) – 4:15
"Summer's Day Song" (Original without vocals) – 3:25
"Waterfalls" (DJ edit) – 3:20

Disc 4 – DVD
"Meet Paul McCartney"
"Coming Up" (music video)
"Waterfalls" (music video)
"Wonderful Christmastime" (music video)
"Coming Up" (live at the Concert for the People of Kampuchea, 29 December 1979)
"Coming Up" (from a rehearsal session at Lower Gate Farm, 1979)
"Making the Coming Up Music Video"
"Blue Sway" (music video)

Note
 signifies previously unreleased material.

Personnel
Paul McCartney – all vocals and instrumentation, engineer, mixing
 Eddie Klein – mixing assistant

Charts and certifications

Weekly charts

Original release

Reissue

Year-end charts

Certifications and sales

Notes
A^ Until January 1987, Japanese albums chart had been separated into LP, CD, and cassette charts. McCartney II also entered the cassette chart, peaking at number 13.

References

External links

JPGR's Beatles site: Paul McCartney's McCartney II
Collector's Music Review of Paul McCartney – The Lost McCartney Album

Paul McCartney albums
1980 albums
Parlophone albums
Albums produced by Paul McCartney
Columbia Records albums
Capitol Records albums
Hear Music albums
Hear Music video albums
EMI Records albums
CBS Records albums
Albums recorded in a home studio
Sequel albums
New wave albums by English artists